ROKS Dosan Ahn Changho (SS-083) is the lead ship of s. She is expected to be commissioned in 2020.

Development and design 

The Dosan Ahn Changho class are equipped with the Korean Vertical Launching System which will be able to carry up to ten indigenous "Chonryong" land-attack cruise missiles and "Hyunmoo" submarine-launched ballistic missiles (SLBM), becoming the first submarines in the South Korean navy to have this kind of capability. They will also have many other improvements compared to their predecessors built with a greater degree of South Korean technology, especially in the later batches, which will include Samsung SDI lithium-ion batteries. Measured to displace over  submerged during sea trials, they are the largest conventional submarines ever built by South Korea.

Construction and career
Dosan Ahn Changho was laid down on 17 May 2016 at DSME, Geoje and launched on 14 September 2018. She began her sea trials in 2019 and expected to be commissioned in 2022. On 15 September 2021, she was reported to have successfully fired a new submarine launched ballistic missile (SLBM) while submerged.

References

Attack submarines
2018 ships
Submarines of South Korea